Jouda Najah is a Tunisian actress.

Filmography

Cinema 
 2004 : Casting pour un mariage (short film) by Farès Naânaâ
 2005 : Khochkhach by Selma Baccar
 2006 : Bin El Widyene by Khaled Barsaoui
 2013 : Les Épines du jasmin by Rachid Ferchiou
 2017 : El Jaida by Selma Baccar

Television 
 1996 - 1997 : El Khottab Al Bab by Slaheddine Essid : Beya
 2000 : Mnamet Aroussia by Slaheddine Essid : Béhija Azzouz
 2002 : Talak Incha by Moncef Dhouib
 2003 : Chams wa dhilal by Ezzedine Harbaoui
 2003 : Ikhwa wa Zaman by Hamadi Arafa
 2004 : Hissabat w Aqabat by Habib Mselmani
 2008 : Choufli Hal (season 5) by Slaheddine Essid
 2008 - 2014 : Maktoub by Sami Fehri : Jamila Néji
 2013 - 2014 : Happy Ness by Majdi Smiri : Dalila
 2013 : Zawja El Khamsa by Habib Mselmani
 2017 : Nsibti Laaziza (season 7) by Slaheddine Essid

Videos 
 2018 : advertising spot for the Tunisian oil brand Jadida

References

External links

Tunisian film actresses
People from Tunis
Living people
20th-century Tunisian actresses
Year of birth missing (living people)